Gonzaga College SJ is a voluntary Catholic boys' secondary school in Ranelagh, Dublin, Ireland.  Founded in 1950, Gonzaga College is under the trusteeship of the Society of Jesus (the Jesuit Order), one of five Jesuit secondary schools in Ireland. The curriculum is traditional, with a broad general programme of subjects including Latin and Greek at junior cycle and the opportunity in senior cycle to study eight subjects for the Leaving Certificate.

The school is named after the early Jesuit Saint Aloysius Gonzaga and takes its emblem from the coat of arms of the Gonzaga family. The school has a liberal, intellectual, and Jesuit ethos.
 
The annual fee for the 2019–2020 academic year was €6,605.

Campus 

The school buildings include a library, chapel, clock tower, theatre, priests' residence, science block, and 84 individual classrooms. The architecture of the school mixes modern copper-roofed buildings with older period houses. Some sections of the school grounds were sold to developers for housing estates in 1984.

In 2007, the school began to work on a major extension project, increasing the size of the school building by 84%. The new building opened to students for the 2009–10 school year.

Academic performance 
Gonzaga College has a reputation for academic excellence. The use of examinations to select pupils for admission has been discontinued following government intervention (the state part-funds the school by paying most teachers' salaries), although boys and parents are interviewed ("the interview is a sharing of ideas"). In 2018 it was the top all-boys secondary school in Ireland in terms of the percentage of students who progressed to university, with 85.9% of all students doing so. In 2019, 36.1% of students progressed to UCD, while 38.1% progressed to TCD and 19.6% progressed to TUD.

Visual arts, theatre, and music are emphasised in the curriculum; pupils are encouraged to study Latin and Greek.

Sports and games
The school chess team has been particularly successful, winning national and international awards. Notably, their achievements include dozens of Leinster and All-Ireland titles as well as winning the prestigious Millfield International Chess Tournament, held in Somerset, UK, in 1992, 1999, 2014  2015, 2016, 2017, 2018, and 2019.

Sports 

The primary sport focused on in Gonzaga is rugby, however many other sports such as hurling, tennis, golf, cricket, badminton, and athletics are also played within the school.

The Junior Cup Rugby teams of 1989, 2003, and 2006 reached the final of the Leinster Schools Junior Cup. The Senior Cup Team (SCT) have reached three semi finals and three finals. The SCT of 2019 reached the final of the Senior Cup for the first time in the college's history, losing to Saint Michael's College. The 2023 team won the school's first ever Senior Cup, beating holders Blackrock with a score of 35-31 on 17 March, 2023. They have also won the Senior League (for middle-ranking schools) on several occasions. The school has produced a small number of professional rugby players and seven Irish internationals: Tony Ensor, John Cooney,  Barry Bresnihan (who went on to represent the British and Irish Lions), Padraig Kenny, Kevin McLaughlin, Dominic Ryan, and Matt Healy.

The school golf team won Leinster titles in 1999 and 2006. Previously, the team reached the semi-finals of the junior cup. In 2010, the Senior Team won the Leinster Schools Senior Matchplay competition, beating Blackrock College 3½ to 1½. They went on to win the All-Ireland Golf Championship in April 2010.

Gaelic games were not played in the past but, in recent years, a team has been entered in a Gaelic football blitz involving other rugby-playing schools. Hurling has also been introduced in recent years.

The school is occasionally represented by a soccer team in friendly matches, but association football is not an official sport of the school.

The main sports in the college during the summer term are lawn tennis and cricket. Gonzaga has a strong tennis tradition, producing many of Ireland's finest tennis players including Barry King, Seán Molloy and Jerry Sheehan. The college has also produced three cricket internationals, most recently bowler George Dockrell, as well as Ireland internationals in bridge, lawn bowls and fencing. The school also has a rich history of competition in Ultimate Frisbee, winning several Schools Cups and providing the starting point for many players who have gone on to compete internationally at various age levels.

Chess 

The school has a tradition of strong chess teams which have been victorious in numerous Leinster and national championships. In 2012, 2013 and 2014, they were Leinster and All Ireland champions at minor, junior and senior levels – an unprecedented clean sweep of Irish schools chess. Of the school chess teams' many achievements, most noteworthy was winning the prestigious Millfield International Chess Tournament in England in 1992, 1999, 2014, 2015, 2016, 2017, 2018 and 2019 while also winning the Eton College Rapidplay in 2016. Many school chess players have built on their experiences at the college and after graduating continued to greater success, including International Masters Sam Collins and Mark Quinn.

Gonazga Chess Club, which includes pupils and adults competes in the Leinster Chess Union leagues, with the club being very successful in recent years, winning the first division Armstrong Cup 2015, 2016, 2017, 2018, and 2019.

Buildings 

Initially the school consisted of the three Bewley buildings on the site, one being used for the school, one as a Jesuit house of residence, and one as a lunch room, changing rooms, science laboratories, etc. In the 1950s, Andrew Devane of Robinson Keefe Devane Architects prepared a masterplan with a school hall between the two main houses and classroom wings extending to the two main houses. The masterplan included a chapel in front of the hall and main entrance. Over the 1950s the classroom wing linked to the school house was built along with the hall and main entrance. In the 1960s the chapel was built. In the 1980s an additional wing of classrooms was constructed. The school's renovation project finished in time for the 2009–10 school year: the first stage was a complete renovation of the science facilities, while the second stage almost doubled the floor area of the school with new buildings. The extension included the new Purdy Dining Hall, the new Coulson Theatre, a gym changing area, and classrooms. The old school hall was completely renovated into a modern library named the Sutherland Library with meeting rooms and study facilities. In 2019-2020 there are tentative plans for a major development of the older section of the school.

Notable past pupils

Academia
Anthony Clare — psychiatrist and broadcaster
Peter Clinch — Jean Monnet Professor of European Policy at University College Dublin and economic adviser to former Taoiseach Brian Cowen
George K. Miley — Professor of Astronomy, Leiden University
Diarmuid Rossa Phelan — Associate Professor, Law, Trinity College Dublin

Arts and media
Finghin Collins — concert pianist
Conor Deasy — lead singer with The Thrills
Paul Durcan — poet
Jack Gleeson — actor
Aidan Mathews — poet, dramatist, novelist.
Redmond Morris, 4th Baron Killanin — film producer
Fionn O'Shea — actor
Andrew Scott — actor
Ronan Sheehan — novelist, short story writer, essayist, and former copyright lawyer
Hugh Tinney — concert pianist

Law
Paul Carney — Irish High Court judge
Kevin Feeney — Irish High Court judge
Charles Lysaght — lawyer and obituary writer

Politics and diplomacy
Patrick Costello — Green Party TD
Ciarán Cuffe — Green Party MEP and former TD and Minister of State for Horticulture, Sustainable Travel, and Planning and Heritage
Jim O'Callaghan — Fianna Fail TD
Eamon Ryan — Green Party TD and Minister for Communications, Energy and Natural Resources
Ossian Smyth — Green Party TD and Minister of State for Public Procurement and eGovernment
Peter Sutherland — EU Commissioner, former Director General of the World Trade Organization, former Attorney General of Ireland, former Chairman of BP and Chairman of Goldman Sachs

Sports
Barry Bresnihan — former Irish Rugby international, British and Irish Lions player and renowned doctor
Sam Collins — International Master of chess
Tony Ensor — Irish rugby international
Matt Healy - Connacht Rugby player and  Ireland international
Osgar O'Hoisin - Irish Davis Cup Tennis Player
Mark Dowling - Irish Tennis Player
George Dockrell - Ireland Cricket Team

See also
 List of Jesuit schools
 List of Jesuit sites in Ireland

References

Further reading
Parent Power: Zealous ethos drives Gonzaga to the top, The Sunday Times.
Archived history page from old version of the college website
A Short History of Gonzaga College, 1950–2000, Christopher J. Finlay, Dublin, September 2000, Eneclann Ltd. .

External links 
School website
Gonzaga past pupils union

Boys' schools in the Republic of Ireland
Secondary schools in County Dublin
Jesuit secondary schools in Ireland
Private schools in the Republic of Ireland
Ranelagh